Iceman is a 2014 Hong Kong-Chinese 3D martial arts action-comedy film directed by Law Wing-cheung and starring Donnie Yen, who also serves as the film's action director. The film is a remake of the 1989 film The Iceman Cometh which was directed by Clarence Fok and starred Yuen Biao. The film was released in Hong Kong and China on April 25, 2014.

Plot
A Ming Dynasty officer, He Ying, was tasked with bringing a mythical time traveling device from India with a LINGA back to the Ming emperor. He was betrayed, and subsequently frozen. He Ying, Sao and Niehu were frozen during a fight. They were discovered and put in cryo-stasis pods and transferred to modern-day Hong Kong. During transit, an accident sets them free. The three escape into the city. Niehu and Sao are set on exacting revenge on He Ying, despite not understanding the world they are in. He Ying soon befriends May, who takes advantage of his confusion about the modern world by charging him exorbitant amount of money for rent, food, and so on. Niehu and Sao unknowingly help two Indian mobsters escape the police, and as a result join the Indian mob.

It is revealed that Cheung is looking for the trio, in particular He Ying. Through various flashbacks, it is revealed that all four were blood brothers who fought side by side, before He Ying was betrayed and charged with treason. After several encounters in the modern world including meeting May's mother, fleeing custody of the police (using his master martial arts skills), and the use of technology, He Ying starts to figure out who is ultimately hunting down Cheung.

Cast

Production
Filming for Iceman began on December 19, 2012 in Hong Kong. Originally produced at a budget of HK$100 million, the production soared up to Hong Kong $200 million due to its slow-paced filming and to cover the film crew's insurance. Because the Hong Kong government did not approve the film to shoot at the Tsing Ma Bridge, an addition of Hong Kong $50 million was spent in order to build an imitation set of the Tsing Ma Bridge. Lead actor and action director Donnie Yen said that a seven-minute fight scene took ten days to shoot. Besides Hong Kong, a chunk of the film would also be filmed in Beijing. For a car chase scene, actor Julian Cheung also loaned his black Lamborghini to the production.

Filming locations include Hong Kong's defunct Kai Tak Airport and the Changbai Mountains.

Music
Jam Hsiao was handpicked by Donnie Yen for the Mandarin theme song. The Cantonese version was performed by Hong Kong singer and actor Julian Cheung.

Reception
The Hollywood Reporter writes "Plagued by all manner of production snafus and a ballooning budget, the problems show in the final product. Iceman is a fractured and often baffling martial 'epic' that not even popular star Donnie Yen is likely to be able to save." Screendaily writes the film is "beset by multiple problems, from a patchy incoherent script, to jarring shifts in tone and genre, and sub-par action and effects sequences that even the star presence of Donnie Yen may find hard to reconcile." Donnie Yen's performance won him the Golden Broom Award for Worst Actor.

See also
Donnie Yen filmography

References

External links

2014 3D films
2014 films
2014 martial arts films
2010s martial arts comedy films
2010s Cantonese-language films
2010s Mandarin-language films
Chinese 3D films
Chinese martial arts comedy films
Chinese action comedy films
Remakes of Hong Kong films
Films directed by Law Wing-cheung
Films set in Hong Kong
Films set in the Ming dynasty
Films shot in Beijing
Films shot in Hong Kong
Films about time travel
Hong Kong 3D films
Hong Kong action comedy films
Kung fu films
Hong Kong martial arts comedy films
2014 comedy films
2010s Hong Kong films